Materials Research Letters is an open-access, peer-reviewed scientific journal, targeted to be a high impact, fast communication letters journal for the materials research community. It was established in 2013. According to the Journal Citation Reports, the journal has a 2020 impact factor of 7.323.

References

English-language journals
Materials science journals